Bruno Steck (born September 22, 1957, in Molsheim, Bas-Rhin) is a former French football player and manager. He has been managing Trélissac FC since 2008.

References

Profile

1957 births
Living people
Sportspeople from Bas-Rhin
French footballers
FC Nantes players
Angers SCO players
Stade Rennais F.C. players
Tours FC players
Stade Brestois 29 players
Chamois Niortais F.C. players
Ligue 1 players
Ligue 2 players
French football managers
Angers SCO managers
US Orléans managers
Association football midfielders
Footballers from Alsace